Carroll Electric Cooperative is a non-profit rural electric utility cooperative headquartered in Carrollton, Ohio. It is one of 25 electric cooperatives that serve the state of Ohio.

The Cooperative was organized in 1938, and the first power lines were energized in December 1939.

As of May 2016, the Cooperative had  of power lines, and serviced more than 12,400 customers, in portions of six counties in the eastern part of Ohio:
Carroll
Columbiana
Harrison
Jefferson
Stark
Tuscarawas

References

Companies based in Ohio
Electric cooperatives in Ohio
Carroll County, Ohio